Sakthi is a 1997 Indian Tamil-language drama film directed by R. Raghuraj, making his directorial debut. The film stars Vineeth and Yuvarani, with Nizhalgal Ravi, Vadivelu, Manorama, Sivakumar, Viji, Raadhika and Vittal Rao playing supporting roles. The film, produced by K. T. Kunjumon, had musical score and soundtrack by popular advertising film composer  R. Anandh, who had then debuted in cinema with the high budget Mohanlal-starrer Nirnayam. and was released on 10 January 1997. The film bombed at the box-office.

Plot 

In the past, the young Seethalakshmi became pregnant but she didn't reveal the father's identity. To punish her, the village chief Periya Ayya ordered her to live alone in a small hut and after the childbirth, he took her newborn son. Whereas, Dharmaraj and Varalakshmi got married. Periya Ayya then sent the baby to another village.

Years later, Sakthi returns to his village and becomes the manager of the village's temple. Sakthi thinks he is an orphan. Afterwards, Sakthi and Raani fall in love with each other. Soon, Varalakshmi's brother Sethupathi tries to rob the temple's costly things. On his first attempt, Sethupathi's henchmen fail because of Sakthi. The second time, he robs the temple's Kalasam. He then traps the innocent Sakthi and Periya Ayya dismisses him. Sakthi finally discovers his parents' identities: Dharmaraj and Seethalakshmi. What transpires later forms the crux of the story.

Cast 

Vineeth as Sakthi
Yuvarani as Raani
Nizhalgal Ravi as Sethupathi
Vadivelu as Irulandi
Manorama as Velammal
Sivakumar as Dharmaraj
Viji as Varalakshmi
Raadhika as Seethalakshmi
Vittal Rao as Periya Ayya
Periya Karuppu Thevar
Mayilsamy
King Kong
Baby Jennifer as Devi
Eswara Pandian
Tirupur Ramasamy as Karuppu
Kovai Senthil
Chelladurai
Jayamani

Production 
The film was shot at Pollachi.

Soundtrack 
The film score and the soundtrack were composed by R. Anandh. The soundtrack, released in 1997, features 6 tracks with lyrics written by Vairamuthu.

References

External links 
 

1990s action drama films
1990s Tamil-language films
1997 directorial debut films
1997 films
Indian action drama films